Mary Ro Reyes (born January 4, 1992, in Puebla) is a Mexican figure skater.

Results

References 

Mexican female single skaters
1992 births
Living people
Competitors at the 2015 Winter Universiade
Competitors at the 2013 Winter Universiade